The Guildford Giants were a rugby league team based in Guildford, Surrey. They competed in the London and South East Division of the Rugby League Conference from 2009 to 2014.

History
Guildford Giants were formed in December 2008 and were based at Guildford RUFC. The Giants were initially to participate in the London Merit League, but were given the opportunity to enter the RLC London and South Division after Farnborough Falcons withdrew from the competition. The season included a first ever win against Kent Ravens and ended with a 26 - 24 semi final loss away to Greenwich Admirals.

The 2010 season saw a 2nd place league finish behind Elmbridge Eagles and maiden Grand Final appearance by defeating Southampton Spitfires in the semi final. The grand final was played in Guildford, but ended with the Greenwich Admirals taking home the title.

In 2011 the Giants moved to the brand new Surrey Sports Park where the Men's team finished 5th just missing out on a play off place. A new minis section was launched with teams from Under 7 to Under 11 and a Ladies team which played a friendly against Southampton.

At the end of the 2014 Season, the club decided to rebrand with a new name (Surrey Sharks RLFC), new logo and new management team. The new club is based at Surrey Sports Park in Guildford

Teams
As of 2014 Guildford Giants run the following teams:

 Under 9
 Under 11
 Under 13 
 Men's

Honours

Under 7
Mighty Quins Festival: 2011

Seasons

Men's

Sport in Guildford
Rugby League Conference teams
Rugby clubs established in 2008
Rugby league teams in Surrey